The women's finweight is a competition featured at the 2022 World Taekwondo Championships, and was held at the Centro Acuático CODE Metropolitano in Guadalajara, Mexico on 20 November 2022. Finweights were limited to a maximum of 46 kilograms in body mass.

Results
Legend
DQ — Won by disqualification
P — Won by punitive declaration
R — Won by referee stop contest

Finals

Top half

Section 1

Section 2

Bottom half

Section 3

Section 4

References
Draw

External links
Official website

Women's 46
2022 in women's taekwondo